The eighth and final season of American medical drama television series House was ordered on May 10, 2011. It premiered on October 3, 2011. It was the only season not to feature Lisa Edelstein as Dr. Lisa Cuddy. Olivia Wilde (Dr. Remy "Thirteen" Hadley) also left the show after the third episode in order to further her film career, although she returned at the end of the series. On January 8, 2012, Kevin Reilly (Fox president of entertainment) stated that Fox had been "avoiding" a decision on the fate of the series, as it was "hard to imagine the network without House" and that the decision on the future of the series would be a "close call". Hugh Laurie's contract on House expired once the eighth season was over, and Laurie confirmed that once House was over, he would be moving on to strictly film roles. On February 8, 2012, in a joint statement issued by Fox and executive producers David Shore, Katie Jacobs, and Laurie, it was revealed that the season would be the last for House.

It was announced that Shore would direct and co-write the final episode of the show and also that Wilde would return as Thirteen for the penultimate episode and the series finale. Edelstein did not return for the series finale. Kal Penn was reported to be in talks and returned as Dr. Lawrence Kutner. Amber Tamblyn also appeared briefly as Martha M. Masters for the finale. Jennifer Morrison appeared in the finale in a cameo appearance as Allison Cameron. Anne Dudek, Sela Ward and Andre Braugher also reprised their previous recurring/guest roles as Amber Volakis, Stacy Warner, and Darryl Nolan, respectively. The series finale aired on May 21, following a retrospective episode titled "Swan Song".

The opening sequence was changed to add Charlyne Yi and Odette Annable, replacing Edelstein and Wilde. Omar Epps took the place of Edelstein, and Robert Sean Leonard, Jesse Spencer and Peter Jacobson were moved up.

Cast

Main cast
 Hugh Laurie as Dr. Gregory House
 Omar Epps as Dr. Eric Foreman
 Robert Sean Leonard as Dr. James Wilson
 Jesse Spencer as Dr. Robert Chase
 Peter Jacobson as Dr. Chris Taub
 Olivia Wilde as Dr. Remy "Thirteen" Hadley
 Odette Annable as Dr. Jessica Adams
 Charlyne Yi as Dr. Chi Park

Recurring cast
 Karolina Wydra as Dominika Petrova-House
 Diane Baker as Blythe House
 Jennifer Crystal Foley as Rachel Taub
 Zena Grey as Ruby
 Yaya DaCosta as Anita
 Tracy Vilar as Nurse Regina
 Ron Perkins as Dr. Ron Simpson
 Patrick Price as Nurse Jeffrey Sparkman
 Noelle Bellinghausen as Emily
 Wayne Lopez as C.O. Alvarez

Special guest stars
 Andre Braugher as Dr. Darryl Nolan
 Anne Dudek as Dr. Amber Volakis
 Jennifer Morrison as Dr. Allison Cameron
 Kal Penn as Dr. Lawrence Kutner
 Amber Tamblyn as Dr. Martha M. Masters
 Sela Ward as Stacy Warner

Guest stars

Sarah Aldrich, Ryan Alosio, David Anders, Audrey Marie Anderson, Blake Anderson, Skylar Astin, Sharif Atkins, Mark Atteberry, Jamie Bamber, Thom Barry, E. E. Bell, Blake Bertrand, Brad Carter, Carlie Casey, George Cheung, Kevin Christy, Art Chudabala, Roma Chugami, Charles Chun, Jude Ciccolella, Enzo Cilenti, Jessie Collins, Billy Connolly, Mars M. Crain, Samantha Cutaran, Madison Davenport, Amy Davidson, Natalie Dreyfuss, Natalie Dye, Rachel Eggleston, Jamie Elman, Corri English, Arlen Escarpeta, Greg Finley, Amanda Foreman, Ralph Garman, Alexie Gilmore, Margo Harshman, Nik Isbelle, Jaclyn Jonet,  Michael B. Jordan, Deborah Lacey, Lisa Lackey, Jim Lampley, James LeGros, Kai Lennix, Melanie Lynskey, Michael Massee, Heather McComb, Chris McKenna, Julie McNiven, Bridgit Mendler, Wentworth Miller, Derek Mio, Julie Mond, Nate Mooney, Ivo Nandi, Riley Lennon Nice, Michael Nouri, Michael Pare, Robert Pine, Alex Quijano, Channon Roe, Saachiko, John Scurti, Will Shadley, Brian Skala, Michael Bailey Smith, Liza Snyder, Rena Sofer, Sebastian Sozzi, Vincent Spano, Heather Stephens, Patrick Stump, Harrison Thomas, Toni Trucks, Darlene Vogel, Jake Weber, Peter Weller, David Wells, Jaleel White, Kaleti Williams, Jeffrey Wright, Jacob Zachar and Jose Zuniga.

Episodes

Notes

References

2011 American television seasons
2012 American television seasons